Viluppuram, Villupuram or Vizhuppuram is one of the 38 districts that make up the state of Tamil Nadu, India. It was founded on 30 September 1993, prior to which it was part of the Cuddalore district. Vizhuppuram district lies in the way of the national highway connecting Tiruchirappalli and Chennai, and contains historical landmarks like the 500 year-old Gingee Fort.



History
Vizhuppuram district was once a part of the South Arcot district along with the Cuddalore district. Later, the Cuddalore district was bifurcated and Vizhuppuram district came into existence on 30 September 1993. As a result, the Vizhuppuram district's history closely resembles that of Cuddalore's.

The Cholas were among the earliest rulers. Karikala Chola was the most influential. Simhavishnu Pallava overthrew the Cholas, and the region came under the Pallava rule. Vijayalaya Chola restored the rule of Chola, marking the beginning of the Chola Empire.

The entire district became a war zone during the Anglo-French rivalry and it came under the control of the East India Company. It remained under British authority until the independence of India in 1947.

Geography 
The district shares borders with Bay of Bengal in the east, Puducherry district of the union territory Puducherry in the southeast and the districts Chengalpattu and Tiruvannamalai in the north, Cuddalore in the south and Kallakurichi in the west.

Politics  

|}

Economy
In 2006, the Ministry of Panchayati Raj named Vizhuppuram one of the 250 most backward districts (out of a total of 640) in the country. It is one of the six districts in Tamil Nadu currently receiving funding from the Backward Regions Grant Fund Program (BRGFP).

Taluks
Viluppuram district is composed of 9 taluks:
 Gingee
 Kandachipuram
 Marakkanam
 Melmalayanur
 Tindivanam
 Tiruvennainallur
 Vanur
 Vikravandi
 Villupuram

Demographics

According to 2011 census, the Viluppuram district had a population of 3,458,873 with a sex-ratio of 987 females per 1,000 males, which is well above the national average of 929. A total of 404,106 residents were under the age of six, constituting 208,246 males and 195,860 females. Scheduled Castes and Scheduled Tribes accounted for 29.37% and 2.16% of the population, respectively.

The average literacy of the district was 63.48%, compared to the national average of 72.99%. The district had a total of 800,368 households. There were a total of 1,703,249 workers, including 322,900 farmers, 537,581 farm workers, 23,961 in household industries, 376,360 other workers, 442,447 marginal workers, 46,746 marginal farmers, 294,632 marginal farm workers, 14,276 marginal workers in household industries and 86,793 other marginal workers.

See also
List of districts of Tamil Nadu

References

External links

 Official website
 Viluppuram district marked on OpenStreetMap

 
1993 establishments in Tamil Nadu
Districts of Tamil Nadu